The 1923 Primera División championship was the first tournament organized by the Uruguayan Football Federation (FUF), a dissident association founded by clubs Central Español and Peñarol that had recently disaffiliated from the Uruguayan Football Association (AUF). The tournament was held simultaneously with the AUF, in the episode known as the "schism of Uruguayan football".

Overview 
The tournament consisted of a round-robin tournament. It involved 32 teams, all newly enrolled to this new federation, and many of them had close relationship with the CA Penarol baptized teams with names such as "Peñarol del Plata", "Roland Moor" or "Roberto Chery" which directly referenced that club. Finally, Atlético Wanderers won the title. The squad played the tournament with an alternate team due to the senior squad was participating of the official 1923 Primera División (AUF).

League standings

See also
1923 Uruguayan Primera División of AUF

Uru
1923 in Uruguayan football
Football competitions in Uruguay